The Torre PwC, formerly Torre Sacyr Vallehermoso, is a 52-floor,  skyscraper, completed in 2008, located in Madrid, Spain. Torre PwC is one of four buildings in the Cuatro Torres Business Area. It was designed by Carlos Rubio Carvajal and Enrique Álvarez-Sala Walter and was built by Sacyr Sau.

It houses the five-star hotel Eurostars Madrid Tower, which occupies 60% of the tower, with rooms between floors 6 and 27 and at its upper part, a two-storey dining room offering a panoramic view of the city. The professional services firm PricewaterhouseCoopers (PwC) moved its offices in the capital (about 2500 professionals) to this building in July 2011, taking up seventeen floors, between floors 34 and 50, which were vacant at that time. On the same date, the PwC logo was mounted at the top of the building, becoming the highest logo in Spain, installed at almost 236 meters of height. Floors 51-58 are intended for general facilities and equipment of the tower. The building was renamed Torre PwC instead of Torre Sacyr Vallehermoso, after PwC relocated to the tower in 2011.

It is the only tower with double skin facade and it is covered entirely of glass in the form of flakes. On the upper deck there are 3 wind turbines, of 2.5 kW each, capable of producing wind energy for use in the building.

See also
Cuatro Torres Business Area
Torre Caja Madrid
Torre Espacio
Torre de Cristal (Madrid)
List of tallest buildings in Europe

References

External links

Emporis.com - Torre Sacyr Vallehermoso
SkycraperPage.com – Torre Sacyr Vallehermoso

Office buildings completed in 2008
Hotel buildings completed in 2008
Skyscraper office buildings in Madrid
Modernist architecture in Madrid
Hotels in Madrid
2008 establishments in Spain
Hotels established in 2008
Skyscraper hotels in Spain
Skyscrapers in Madrid
Buildings and structures in Fuencarral-El Pardo District, Madrid